Palermo or Wolfsburg is a 1980 West German film by Werner Schroeter. It tells the story of an Italian immigrant who comes to West Germany in search of work.

Cast
 Nicola Zarbo - Nicola Zarbo
 Otto Sander - Prosecutor
 Ida Di Benedetto - Giovanna
 Magdalena Montezuma - Frau Lawyer
 Johannes Wacker - Judge
 Antonio Orlando - Antonio
 Brigitte Tig - Brigitte Hahn
 Gisela Hahn - Brigitte's mother
 Calogero Arancio - Nicola's father
 Cavaliere Comparato - Großgrundbesitzer
 Padre Pace - Pfarrer
 Harry Baer - Hausbestzer
 Ula Stöckl - Schöffin
 Tamara Kafka - Zeugin
 Ines Zamurovic - Dolmetscherin Frau Zamurovic

Awards
The film shared the 1980 Golden Bear with Heartland at the 30th Berlin International Film Festival.

References

External links 
 

1980 films
1980s avant-garde and experimental films
1980 drama films
German avant-garde and experimental films
German drama films
Swiss avant-garde and experimental films
Swiss drama films
West German films
1980s German-language films
Films directed by Werner Schroeter
Golden Bear winners
Films about immigration to Germany
1980s German films